A list of films produced by the Israeli film industry in 1992.

1992 releases

Unknown premiere date

Awards

See also
1992 in Israel

References

External links
 Israeli films of 1992 at the Internet Movie Database

Lists of 1992 films by country or language
Film
1993